Svobodny (masculine), Svobodnaya (feminine), or Svobodnoye (neuter) is the name of several inhabited localities in Russia.

Republic of Adygea
As of 2010, one rural locality in the Republic of Adygea bears this name:
Svobodny, Republic of Adygea, a settlement in Krasnogvardeysky District

Altai Krai
As of 2010, one rural locality in Altai Krai bears this name:
Svobodny, Altai Krai, a settlement in Zavodskoy Selsoviet of Tyumentsevsky District

Amur Oblast
As of 2010, two inhabited localities in Amur Oblast bear this name:
Svobodny, Amur Oblast, a town
Svobodnoye, Amur Oblast, a selo in Novospassky Rural Settlement of Arkharinsky District

Chechen Republic
As of 2010, one rural locality in the Chechen Republic bears this name:
Svobodnoye, Chechen Republic, a selo in Naursky District

Chelyabinsk Oblast
As of 2010, one rural locality in Chelyabinsk Oblast bears this name:
Svobodny, Chelyabinsk Oblast, a settlement in Svobodnensky Selsoviet of Oktyabrsky District

Kaliningrad Oblast
As of 2010, three rural localities in Kaliningrad Oblast bear this name:
Svobodny, Kaliningrad Oblast, a settlement in Turgenevsky Rural Okrug of Polessky District
Svobodnoye, Guryevsky District, Kaliningrad Oblast, a settlement in Kutuzovsky Rural Okrug of Guryevsky District
Svobodnoye, Pravdinsky District, Kaliningrad Oblast, a settlement in Domnovsky Rural Okrug of Pravdinsky District

Kemerovo Oblast
As of 2010, one rural locality in Kemerovo Oblast bears this name:
Svobodny, Kemerovo Oblast, a settlement in Safonovskaya Rural Territory of Novokuznetsky District

Khabarovsk Krai
As of 2010, one rural locality in Khabarovsk Krai bears this name:
Svobodnoye, Khabarovsk Krai, a selo in Nikolayevsky District

Kursk Oblast
As of 2010, one rural locality in Kursk Oblast bears this name:
Svobodny, Kursk Oblast, a khutor in Kolbasovsky Selsoviet of Pristensky District

Leningrad Oblast
As of 2010, one rural locality in Leningrad Oblast bears this name:
Svobodnoye, Leningrad Oblast, a logging depot settlement under the administrative jurisdiction of Kamennogorskoye Settlement Municipal Formation of Vyborgsky District

Lipetsk Oblast
As of 2010, one rural locality in Lipetsk Oblast bears this name:
Svobodnaya, Lipetsk Oblast, a village in Ishcheinsky Selsoviet of Krasninsky District

Republic of Mordovia
As of 2010, two rural localities in the Republic of Mordovia bear this name:
Svobodny, Kochkurovsky District, Republic of Mordovia, a settlement in Voyevodsky Selsoviet of Kochkurovsky District
Svobodny, Yelnikovsky District, Republic of Mordovia, a settlement in Bolsheurkatsky Selsoviet of Yelnikovsky District

Nizhny Novgorod Oblast
As of 2010, four rural localities in Nizhny Novgorod Oblast bear this name:
Svobodny, Naryshkinsky Selsoviet, Voznesensky District, Nizhny Novgorod Oblast, a settlement in Naryshkinsky Selsoviet of Voznesensky District
Svobodny, Sarminsky Selsoviet, Voznesensky District, Nizhny Novgorod Oblast, a settlement in Sarminsky Selsoviet of Voznesensky District
Svobodnoye, Nizhny Novgorod Oblast, a village in Krasnoslobodsky Selsoviet of Bor, Nizhny Novgorod Oblast
Svobodnaya, Nizhny Novgorod Oblast, a village in Bolshetumanovsky Selsoviet of Arzamassky District

Orenburg Oblast
As of 2010, one rural locality in Orenburg Oblast bears this name:
Svobodny, Orenburg Oblast, a settlement in Novoorenburgsky Selsoviet of Kvarkensky District

Primorsky Krai
As of 2010, one rural locality in Primorsky Krai bears this name:
Svobodnoye, Primorsky Krai, a selo in Lazovsky District

Rostov Oblast
As of 2010, four rural localities in Rostov Oblast bear this name:
Svobodny, Kuybyshevsky District, Rostov Oblast, a khutor in Kuybyshevskoye Rural Settlement of Kuybyshevsky District
Svobodny, Tatsinsky District, Rostov Oblast, a khutor in Yermakovskoye Rural Settlement of Tatsinsky District
Svobodny, Tselinsky District, Rostov Oblast, a khutor in Kirovskoye Rural Settlement of Tselinsky District
Svobodnoye, Rostov Oblast, a selo in Fedoseyevskoye Rural Settlement of Zavetinsky District

Ryazan Oblast
As of 2010, two rural localities in Ryazan Oblast bear this name:
Svobodny, Kadomsky District, Ryazan Oblast, a settlement in Voskhodsky Rural Okrug of Kadomsky District
Svobodny, Ukholovsky District, Ryazan Oblast, a settlement in Solovachevsky Rural Okrug of Ukholovsky District

Samara Oblast
As of 2010, one rural locality in Samara Oblast bears this name:
Svobodny, Samara Oblast, a settlement in Kinelsky District

Saratov Oblast
As of 2010, two inhabited localities in Saratov Oblast bear this name:
Svobodny, Bazarno-Karabulaksky District, Saratov Oblast, an urban locality (a work settlement) in Bazarno-Karabulaksky District
Svobodny, Dergachyovsky District, Saratov Oblast, a rural locality (a settlement) in Dergachyovsky District

Sverdlovsk Oblast
As of 2010, one urban locality in Sverdlovsk Oblast bears this name:
Svobodny, Sverdlovsk Oblast, an urban-type settlement